Juan Fuentes Alcazaren (December 27, 1891 – February 1, 1959) was a Filipino Visayan lawyer, legislator, and politician. He was Member of the House of Representatives for the old 4th legislative district of Cebu (1925–1934), Director of Bureau of Lands (1945), and Undersecretary of Department of Foreign Affairs (1958–1959).

Early life 
Juan F. Alcazaren, the son of Leocadio Alcazaren and Calixta Fuentes, was born in Argao, Cebu on December 27, 1891. He studied at the University of the Philippines and became a lawyer on September 24, 1921. On December 27, 1922, he married Corazon Maria de los Nieves L. Albaracin, who was the daughter of then municipal president (equivalent of mayor) of Argao, Don Lorenzo Albaracin, and Candelaria.

Career 
Practicing law, he once worked with the University of Manila.

Congressman 
In 1925, he ran and won as representative of Cebu's old 4th congressional district in the 7th Philippine Legislature. Campaigning under the Nacionalista Party, his other party members such as Pedro Rodriguez for the Senate seat, Arsenio Climaco for governor, representatives Manuel Briones, Paulino Gullas, Mariano Jesus Cuenco, and Paulino Ybanez also won. Alcazaren was elected for two more terms: in 1928 for the 8th Philippine Legislature and in 1931 to 1934 for the 9th Philippine Legislature.

Bureau of Lands 
On December 22, 1945, he was appointed by then President Sergio Osmeña as the Director of the Bureau of Lands, ad interim.

Department of Foreign Affairs 
On March 19, 1958, he was later appointed by then President Carlos P. Garcia as undersecretary of the Department of Foreign Affairs. He served in the said position until his demise in early 1959 Fructuoso Cabahug was appointed undersecretary to replace him on June 1, 1959.

Later years 
Alcazaren died on February 1, 1959, in Quezon City. He was 67. A resolution was filed in the House of Representatives in extending condolences for his passing.

Historical commemoration 

 The Juan Alcazaren Street located in Barangay Poblacion, Argao, Cebu was named in his honor.

References 

1891 births
1959 deaths
Members of the House of Representatives of the Philippines from Cebu
Members of the Philippine Legislature
Osmeña administration cabinet members
Garcia administration cabinet members
20th-century Filipino lawyers
University of the Philippines alumni